Sport Club Bom Jesus was a Brazilian football club based in Matriz de Camaragibe, Alagoas. The team last participated in the Campeonato Alagoano in the 2006 season.

The club was founded on 1 January 1928.

Honours
Campeonato Alagoano Second Division: 1990, 2001

References

Association football clubs established in 1928
Defunct football clubs in Alagoas